is a magical girl anime television series produced by Studio Pierrot which aired on Nippon Television from July 1984 to May 1985. It is an adaptation of the manga series by Takako Aonuma titled Persia ga Suki!. In addition to the TV series, two OVAs were released, and the main character, Persia, also appeared in two other Studio Pierrot special presentations. This was the second of five magical girl anime to be created by Studio Pierrot, and featured the character designs of Yoshiyuki Kishi, who did the character designs for Pierrot's next magical girl series Magical Emi, the Magic Star, is also credited as the series's character designer and animation director.

Plot summary
11-year old Persia is an energetic, caring, loyal and happy young girl who has grown up alongside the animals on the Serengeti plains of Africa wearing only a leopard skin.  Twins Riki and Gaku Muroi and their grandfather, Gōken, bring Persia to Japan with them in Minato-machi (lit. Port Town), where she lives with a couple who own a grocery store.  During an incident during the return flight to Japan, Persia finds herself in the "Lovely Dream", the land where dreams are born and grow. It is a wintry place, and dreams cannot get out. The Fairy Queen appears before Persia in the form of a butterfly, and explains that the Lovely Dream is in danger, requesting Persia's help.  She gives Persia a magical golden headband with a star which reacts to the word "Papurikko". With it, Persia can conjure a magic baton which bridges her world and Lovely Dream, as well as transform into an older self by saying "Perukko Raburin Kurukuru Rinkuru". She is sent with three kappa back into the regular world with the mission of collecting love energy to thaw the frozen Lovely Dream.

Characters

After visiting the Lovely Dream, Persia gains a magical headband with which she can summon a magical baton to transform into a teenager and perform magic. At the beginning she is in love with both Riki and Gaku Muroi, later she will realize her love for Gaku, feeling jealousy for him many times. She can be irresponsible with her magic, for example using it to bring her pet lion Simba to Japan.

Twin brother of Riki and grandson of Gōken, he cares a lot of Persia and he will realize he is falling in love with her.

Twin brother of Gaku and grandson of Gōken, he cares for Persia Hayami as if she were his little sister.  He is dating Sayo Mitomo.

Girlfriend of Riki Muroi.

One of the kappa from the Lovely Dream who accompany Persia. He wears an orange shirt and often scolds Persia when she does something irresponsible. His name means "guffawing".

One of the kappa from the Lovely Dream who accompany Persia. He's something of a coward and wears a red bow tie. His name comes from a Japanese psychomime for the sound of whimpering, possibly due to his cowardly nature.

One of the kappa from the Lovely Dream who accompany Persia. Puri Puri is a girl kappa. She wears a pink purse over her shoulder. Her name comes from an onomatopoeia meaning "huffing", probably due to her habit of scolding Persia.

A lion from Africa, Simba is Persia's best friend.  She used her magic to bring him to Japan, then to transform him into a cat so that he could stay with her.  Her magic also allows him to speak in the human language.

Husband of Kumi and adopted father of Persia, Hideki runs a grocery store with his wife.

Wife of Hideki and adopted mother of Persia, Kumi runs a grocery store with her husband.

Grandfather of Gaku and Riki, Gōken brought Persia to Japan and helps her to settle into Japanese life.

A girl in Persia's class. She has a huge crush on Gaku and dreams of being with him. She is jealous of Persia because she gets to spend time with Gaku.

 and Yuriko Yamamoto

Music

Original songs
By Maikoo Okamoto
  (OP 1)
  (ED 1)
By MIMA
  (OP 2)
By Miina Tominaga
  (ED 2
)

Manga
The manga, was serialized in Weekly Margaret magazine from 1984 through October 1985, and released as nine tankōbon published by Shueisha. It was republished in 2000 and 2001 in bunkoban format as six volumes.

Original release
Volume 1: 
Volume 2: 
Volume 3: ISBN
Volume 4: 
Volume 5: 
Volume 6: 
Volume 7: 
Volume 8: 
Volume 9:

Bunkoban
Volume 1: 
Volume 2: 
Volume 3: 
Volume 4: 
Volume 5: 
Volume 6:

Impact and influence
Persia stars in Adesugata Mahou no Sannin Musume, along with Creamy Mami and Magical Emi. She is also in Majokko Club Yoningumi A-Kukan Kara no Alien X, with Creamy Mami, Magical Emi and Pastel Yumi. The series was parodied in the 1985 hentai OVA Mahou no Rouge Lipstick.

Distribution 
In the United Kingdom, the series was distributed by HIT Communications PLC in 1994 as The Adventures of Persia.

Internationalization
Magical Fairy Persia was released in and dubbed into Italian as Evelyn e la magia di un sogno d'amore by Studio PV. Was first broadcast on Italia 1 from September 1985, and was first broadcast on Italia Teen Television from July 8, 2004.  It was also released in French as Vanessa et la Magie des Rêves from February 13, 1988.

References

External links
 Magical Girl series site at Studio Pierrot 
  Mahou no Yousei Persia at allcinema.net 
 

1984 anime television series debuts
1987 anime OVAs
Magical girl anime and manga
Nippon TV original programming
Pierrot (company)
Romance anime and manga
Shueisha manga
Television series by Mattel Creations